The 2010 Armenian Cup was the 19th season of Armenian knockout football competition. It featured only the 8 Premier League teams. The tournament started on 23 March 2010. Pyunik won their second consecutive cup with a 4–0 victory over Banants in the final.  Because Pyunik qualified for the 2010–11 UEFA Champions League as league champions, Banants claimed the cup winner berth in the 2010–11 UEFA Europa League.

Results

Quarter-finals
The eight clubs in that year's Armenian Premier League competed in this round. The first legs were played on 23 and 24 March 2010 and the second legs were played on 6 and 7 April 2010.

|}

Semi-finals
The four winners from the quarterfinals entered this round. The first legs were played on 13 and 14 April 2010 and the second legs were played on 20 and 21 April 2010

|}

Final

See also
 2010 Armenian Premier League
 2010 Armenian First League

External links
 http://www.ffa.am/en/competitions/armeniacup/2010/ Official site
 Armenian Cup 2010 at Soccerway.com
 Armenia Cup 2010 at rsssf.com

2010
Armenian Cup
Cup